The World War I Memorial is a bronze sculpture, in Berwick, Pennsylvania.

The inscription reads:
(Bronze plaque on front of base:) 
DEDICATED TO ALL MEN OF BERWICK AND
VICINITY WHO FOUGHT IN THE WORLD WAR
-TO THOSE WHO FOUGHT AND LIVED, AND THOSE
WHO FOUGHT AND DIED; TO THOSE WHO GAVE
MUCH, AND THOSE WHO GAVE ALL.
1914 IN MEMORIUM(sic) 1918
(list of names)
ERECTED BY THE MOSES VAN CAMPEN CHAPTER DAR 1923.

References 

Outdoor sculptures in Pennsylvania
1923 sculptures
Bronze sculptures in Pennsylvania
Statues in Pennsylvania
Monuments and memorials in Pennsylvania
Military monuments and memorials in the United States
1923 establishments in Pennsylvania
Sculptures of men in Pennsylvania